Sharif Nazarov (born February 2, 1946, Tajikistan) is Tajikistani football coach.

Managing career

As one of the most successful coaches from Tajikistan, he won the Tajik League twice with SKA-Pamir Dushanbe in 1992 and 1995; and with Varzob Dushanbe in 1999 and 2000. He won the Tajik Cup on three occasions SKA-Pamir Dushanbe in 1992, Varzob Dushanbe in 1999 and FC Aviator in 2004.

Nazarov has also been the most successful head coach for the Tajikistan national football team, as he led the national team to a third-place finish at the 1993 ECO Cup and won the 2006 AFC Challenge Cup.

Nazarov was appointed as the manager of Khayr Vahdat on 17 March 2016.

Honours

Manager
Pamir
 Tajik League (1): 1992
 Tajik Cup (1): 1992
 ECO Cup semi-finals/3rd place: 1993

Varzob
 Tajik League (3): 1998, 1999, 2000
 Tajik Cup (2): 1999, 2004

National
 AFC Challenge Cup champion: 2006

Individual
 Merited Coach of USSR
 Merited Coach of the Republic of Tajikistan
 Coach of the Year in Tajikistan (2):  2002, 2004

References

External links

Living people
1946 births
Tajikistani football managers
Tajikistani expatriate football managers
Tajikistan national football team managers
Merited Coaches of the Soviet Union
Merited Coaches of Tajikistan
Tajikistani footballers
Soviet footballers
CSKA Pamir Dushanbe players
CSKA Pamir Dushanbe managers
Soviet football managers
Soviet expatriate football managers
Expatriate football managers in Egypt
Soviet expatriate sportspeople in Egypt
Expatriate football managers in Uzbekistan
Association footballers not categorized by position
Tajikistani expatriate sportspeople in Uzbekistan